The Scottish Rugby Academy provides Scotland's up and coming rugby stars a dedicated focused routeway for development into the professional game. Entry is restricted to Scottish qualified students and both male and female entrants are accepted into 4 regional academies. The 2019-20 season sees the fifth year of the academy, now sponsored by Fosroc.

Season overview

This was the fifth year of the Scottish Rugby Academy.

Regional Academies

The Scottish Rugby Academy runs four regional academies in Scotland:- Glasgow and the West, Borders and East Lothian, Edinburgh and Caledonia. These roughly correspond to the traditional districts of Glasgow District, South, Edinburgh District and North and Midlands.

Stages

Players are selected in three stages:-

Supported stages

Stage 1 - Regionally selected and regionally supported players
Stage 2 - Nationally selected and regionally supported players

Contracted stage

Stage 3 - Nationally selected and regionally supported players assigned to a professional team.

Academy Players

Stage 3 players

Stage 3 players are assigned to a professional team. Nominally, for the men, Glasgow Warriors receive the Stage 3 players of Glasgow and the West and Caledonia regions, while Edinburgh Rugby receive the Stage 3 players of the Edinburgh and Borders and East Lothian regions. The women are integrated into the Scotland women's national rugby sevens team and the Scotland women's national rugby union team.

This season some of the Stage 3 players were additionally loaned out to Stade Niçois for their development.

This year, in addition to being assigned to Glasgow Warriors and Edinburgh Rugby, the male Stage 3 players are also assigned to the professional Super 6 sides. Thus, half of the Super 6 teams are allied to Glasgow Warriors:- Stirling County, Ayrshire Bulls and Boroughmuir Bears; the other half allied to Edinburgh Rugby:- Watsonians, Southern Knights and Heriot's Rugby.

Borders and East Lothian

Jacob Henry and Nathan Sweeney join the Borders Academy at Stage 3 this season; Henry being promoted from Stage 2 and Sweeney a direct entrant. Fraser Renwick drops out from last year.

Caledonia

Angus Fraser, Gregor Brown and Grant Hughes all join the Caledonia Academy this season; Fraser and Hughes being promoted from the Stage 2 section of last year's academy, Brown as a direct entrant . Ollie Smith transfers in from the Glasgow Academy; Murphy Walker transfers from the Caledonia Academy to the Glasgow Academy.

Edinburgh

Matt Currie, Dan Gamble, Sam Grahamslaw, Charlie Jupp, Scott King, Jack Mann, Harry Paterson and Cameron Scott all join as Stage 3 players this year in addition to stalwarts Shaun Gunn, Dan Winning, Connor Boyle. Jupp and Gamble were promoted from last year's Stage 2; the others joining as direct entrants. Rufus McLean transfers to the Glasgow Academy. Duncan Ferguson, Callum Atkinson, and Robbie Davis all drop out. Ross Dunbar has signed with Stade Niçois.

}

Glasgow and the West

Rufus McLean transfers in from the Edinburgh Academy. Murphy Walker transfers in from the Caledonia Academy. Ollie Smith transfers to the Caledonia Academy. Kaleem Barreto is loaned out to Stade Niçois. Logan Trotter has signed for Super 6 side Stirling County. The lock Rory Jackson is promoted from Stage 2

Stade Niçois

Stade Niçois is a French rugby union side. In season 2019-20 they play in the French third tier, in Fédérale 1. They have a partnership agreement with the SRU.

Cammy Hutchison from last year's Academy has now signed with Heriots Rugby.

Supported players

The inductees for the 2019-20 season are split into their regional academies. The male players are still in Stage 1 and Stage 2 of the academy and not yet deemed professional players. The women named, however, may be international players, using the academy for support.

Borders and East Lothian

 Archie Bogle (Melrose / Duns) - Prop
 Scott Clark (Preston Lodge) - Fly Half
 Kieran Clarke (Earlston HS / Melrose) - Full Back
 Sam Derrick (Earlston HS / Melrose) - Flanker
 Patrick Harrison (Peebles) - Hooker
 Thomas Jeffrey (Jed Forest) - Prop
 James Johnstone (Preston Lodge) - Hooker
 Vangel Kacori (Watsonians) - Center
 Matthew Kindness  (Kelso) - Center
 Ben Pickles (Preston Lodge) - Center
 Matt Reid (Galashiels Academy / Wanderers) - Wing
 Mak Wilson (Southern Knights) - Prop
 Lana Skeldon (DMP Sharks)
 Corey Tait (Hawick HS / RFC)

Caledonia

 Tim Brown (Dundee HSFP) - Flanker 
 Euan Cunningham (Stirling County) - Fly Half
 Jack Duncan (Ellon) - Fly Half
 Archie Falconer (Ellon) - Hooker
 Thomas Glendinning (Kirkcaldy) - Center
 Michael Gray (Dollar Academy) - Center
 Joe Halliday (Strathallan) - Hooker
 Mikey Heron (Stirling Wolves) - Full Back
 Josh King (Stirling County) - Flanker
 Ross McKnight (Dollar Academy) - Wing
 Alex Samuel (Stirling County) - Lock
 Ben Salmon (Dollar Academy) - Wing
 Callum Stephen (Deeside Rugby) - Wing
 Max Williamson (Dollar Academy) - Lock/Flanker
 Siobhan Cattigan (Stirling County)
 Mairi Forsyth (Corstorphine Cougars)
 Emma Wassell (Corstorphine Cougars)
 Megan Kennedy (Stirling County).

Edinburgh

 Callum Anderson (George Heriot’s School) - Lock
 Ryan Daley (George Watson’s College) - Wing
 Angus Hoffie (George Watson’s College) - Wing
 Duncan Hood (Stewart’s Melville College) - Hooker
 Michael Jones  (Stewart’s Melville College) - Flanker/Prop
 Cole Lamberton (Edinburgh Accies) - Prop
 Fraser MacAslan (Royal High School) - Hooker
 Gregor Scougall (George Watson’s College) - Prop
 Struan Whittaker (Edinburgh Accies) - Lock
 Patrick McVeigh (Heriot’s Rugby / Edinburgh University) - Flanker
 Cameron Scott (Watsonians) - Scrum Half
 Robbie Simpson (Edinburgh Accies) - Hooker
 Christian Townsend (Stewart’s Melville College) - Fly Half
 Sarah Denholm (Edinburgh University)
 Megan Gaffney (Watsonians)
 Nicola Howat (Edinburgh University)
 Sarah Law (DMP Sharks)
 Liz Musgrove (DMP Sharks)
 Panashe Muzambe (Edinburgh University / Watsonians)
 Annabel Sergeant (Heriot’s)
 Hannah Smith (Watsonians)
 Lisa Thomson (DMP Sharks)
 Molly Wright (Watsonians)

Glasgow and the West

 Trystan Andrews  (Melrose) - Flanker
 George Breese (Stirling County) - Prop
 Finlay Callaghan (GHK) - Full Back
 Jamie Campbell (Biggar) - Lock
 Scott Clelland (Ayr) - Hooker
 Jordan Craig (GHA) - Wing
 Jamie Drummond  (Marr) - Prop/Hooker
 Dean Hunter (Stirling County) - Prop
 Adam Scott (GHA) - Center
 Joseph Strain (Glasgow Hawks) - Fly Half
 Gavin Wilson (Ayrshire Bulls) - Flanker
 Cameron Young (Ayr) - Flanker
 Sophie Anderson (Hillhead Jordanhill)
 Rachel McLachlan (DMP Sharks)
 Louise McMillan (Hillhead Jordanhill)

Super 6 intake

Ayrshire Bulls

Boroughmuir Bears

Heriots Rugby

Southern Knights

Stirling County

Watsonians

Graduates of this year 

Players who have signed professional contracts with clubs:

  Cameron Henderson to  Leicester Tigers
  Marshall Sykes to  Edinburgh Rugby
  Rufus McLean to  Glasgow Warriors

References

2019-20
2019–20 in Scottish rugby union